Christos Charissis (alternate spellings: Charisis, Harissis, Harisis) (born July 9, 1976) is a retired Greek professional basketball player. At 191 cm or 6'3" in height, he played at the point guard position.

Professional career
In his professional club career, Charissis was a member of Arion, Irakleio, Tau Vitoria, Olympiacos, Apollon Patras, Montepaschi Siena, Prokom Trefl Sopot, PAOK, and Kolossos Rodou.

National team career
Charissis played with the senior men's Greek national basketball team at the EuroBasket 2003.

Awards and accomplishments
Greek League All-Star: (2002, 2003, 2005)

References

External links
Euroleague.net Profile
Eurobasket.com Profile
Italian League Profile 
Spanish League Profile 
Greek Basket League Profile 
Hellenic Federation Profile 

1976 births
Living people
Apollon Patras B.C. players
Asseco Gdynia players
Greek expatriate basketball people in Italy
Greek Basket League players
Greek expatriate basketball people in Poland
Greek expatriate basketball people in Spain
Greek men's basketball players
Irakleio B.C. players
Liga ACB players
Mens Sana Basket players
Olympiacos B.C. players
P.A.O.K. BC players
Point guards
Saski Baskonia players
Basketball players from Athens